Batuhan Ünsal (born 3 June 1997) is a Turkish professional footballer who plays as a goalkeeper.

Professional career
Ünsal made his professional debut with Erzurumspor in a 3-1 Süper Lig win over Yeni Malatyaspor on 27 December 2020.

References

External links
 
 

1997 births
Sportspeople from Antalya
Living people
Turkish footballers
Association football goalkeepers
Ankaraspor footballers
Büyükşehir Belediye Erzurumspor footballers
Sarıyer S.K. footballers
Süper Lig players
TFF Second League players
TFF Third League players